The Central District of Kordkuy County is a district (bakhsh) in Kordkuy County, Golestan Province, Iran. At the 2006 census, its population was 67,427, in 17,617 families.  The District has one city: Kordkuy. The District has three rural districts (dehestans): Chaharkuh Rural District, Sadan Rostaq-e Gharbi Rural District, and Sadan Rostaq-e Sharqi Rural District.

References 

Districts of Golestan Province
Kordkuy County